Patrik Eliáš (born 13 April 1976) is a Czech former professional hockey winger who played 20 seasons in the National Hockey League (NHL) with the New Jersey Devils. Eliáš is the franchise's all-time leader in points, goals and assists, and he holds the franchise records for the most points in a season (96) along with most career game-winning goals (79). Eliáš won the Stanley Cup twice with the Devils, in 2000 and 2003. He also ranks second in points by a Czech-born player in the NHL behind Jaromír Jágr. Internationally Eliáš represented the Czech national team in multiple tournaments, including four Winter Olympics and four World Championships, winning one Olympic bronze medal and two more at the World Championships.

Playing career
 
Eliáš was drafted by the New Jersey Devils in the second round, 51st overall, in the 1994 NHL Entry Draft.

Along with Petr Sýkora and Jason Arnott (who together formed the Devils' famous "A-Line"), he helped lead the team to a Stanley Cup in the 2000 Stanley Cup playoffs. He scored twice against the Philadelphia Flyers in the deciding Game 7 of the Eastern Conference Finals, and also assisted on Arnott's Stanley Cup-clinching goal in double overtime in Game 6 away against the Dallas Stars. The following year, he scored a team-record 96 points in the regular season, third-best in the NHL. Two years later, he played a key role in New Jersey's 2003 Stanley Cup victory after recording seven points (three goals and four assists) in the finals series against the Mighty Ducks of Anaheim.

During the 2004–05 NHL lockout, Eliáš played hockey in the Russian Superleague (RSL) for Metallurg Magnitogorsk.

Three months into the 2005–06 season, Eliáš made his first appearance of the season on 3 January 2006, against the Florida Panthers, after missing 39 games due to Hepatitis A, resuming his role as an alternate captain (replacing Alexander Mogilny). He scored eight points in his first four games to help the Devils win his first nine games back with the team. In the first game of the 2006 playoffs, against the New York Rangers, he became the tenth player to score six points in one NHL playoff game, with two goals and four assists. Eliáš' 2006 playoff campaign was spectacular, despite the fact that the Devils were eliminated by the eventual Stanley Cup champions Carolina Hurricanes in the second round. Eliáš recorded 6 goals and 10 assists for an impressive 16 points in just 9 games.

Unable to reach a contract with the Devils entering the 2006 off-season, Eliáš tested unrestricted free agency. In addition to offers from the Chicago Blackhawks and the Montreal Canadiens, Eliáš verbally agreed to sign with the rival New York Rangers on 1 July. However, negotiations stalled when Rangers general manager Glen Sather would not agree on a no-movement clause in his contract. Eliáš subsequently called Devils general manager Lou Lamoriello and the two sides agreed on a seven-year, $42 million contract that included a no-movement clause.

Eliáš was named the Devils' new captain on 5 October 2006, becoming the seventh captain in the team's history. The previous captain of the Devils was defenseman Scott Stevens, now retired. Eliáš became the first European-born captain in the history of the franchise. However, at the start of the 2007–08 season, Eliáš was stripped of the captaincy by incoming head coach Brent Sutter. The Devils named Jamie Langenbrunner his replacement as captain on 5 December 2007.

Sutter later placed Eliáš on a top scoring line which consisted of Dainus Zubrus and Brian Gionta. Eliáš was also known to work well with Devils winger Zach Parise, with whom he occasionally played with on "Heroes Line" and frequently played with on the power-play unit.

On 17 March 2009, Eliáš became the Devils' all-time leading scorer by recording his 702nd career NHL regular season point, an assist on Brian Gionta's shorthanded goal. Gionta's goal was the game-winner in a 3–2 win over the visiting Chicago Blackhawks, providing the difference in goaltender Martin Brodeur's record-breaking 552nd win to surpass Patrick Roy, who held the former record at 551 wins. Chants of "Pa-trik E-li-as" were heard as Devils' PA announcer Kevin Clark confirmed to the crowd that Eliáš had broken John MacLean's record. Eliáš was named the second star of the night, behind only Brodeur.

Eliáš was the winner of the 2009 Golden Hockey Stick as the world's best Czech hockey player, ending Jaromír Jágr's four-year streak. He scored his 300th career goal on 12 December 2009, against the Philadelphia Flyers.

 
Despite a weak first half by the Devils during the 2010–11 season, Eliáš was selected to be the Devils sole representative at the 2011 NHL All-Star Game in Raleigh, North Carolina. This was his third All-Star appearance and he was eventually selected by Team Staal in the first-ever NHL All-Star "fantasy draft". On 19 February 2011, Eliáš recorded the 800th NHL point of his career with his third assist of the game against the Carolina Hurricanes. At the conclusion of the season, on 1 April, Eliáš scored his eighth career hat trick, coming against the Philadelphia Flyers.

In the following 2011–12 season, Eliáš scored two goals (347, 348) against the Montreal Canadiens on 17 December 2011 to tie (then surpass) John MacLean as the Devils' leading goalscorer. Eliáš played his 1,000th career NHL game on 6 January 2012, against the Florida Panthers. In the game, he scored a goal and recorded two assists in a 5–2 victory.

On 27 January 2013, against the Montreal Canadiens, Eliáš recorded his 900th career NHL point with one goal and two assists. On 6 January 2015, in a 4–1 victory against the Buffalo Sabres, he became the 82nd player in NHL history to reach 1,000 career points; he recorded one goal and two assists in the game. One month later, on 6 February in the Devils' 4–1 home win over the Toronto Maple Leafs, Eliáš scored his 400th NHL goal, becoming the 91st player in NHL history to do so.

On 31 March 2017, Eliáš announced his retirement from professional ice hockey.

On 3 August 2017, the Devils announced that his no. 26 would be retired on 24 February 2018, prior to a game against the New York Islanders, the team against whom Eliáš played the most games in his career (91) and scored the most points against (86) over his career. Eliáš became the first forward to have his number retired by the Devils and the fifth Devil overall.

International play
Eliáš played his first game in the national squad in 1998, and has played 40 times for the national team, scoring 20 goals (as of end of season 2010/2011). He was selected as captain of the Czech squad for the 2010 Winter Olympics in Vancouver.

Personal life
Eliáš married Petra Volakova, also a native Czech, in the 2007 off-season. Together they have two daughters. On 11 January 2018, Eliáš became a naturalized citizen of the United States.

Records
 New Jersey Devils record for career points (1025).
 New Jersey Devils record for career goals (408).
 New Jersey Devils record for career assists (617).
 New Jersey Devils all-time leader in playoff goals (45), assists (80), and points (125).
 New Jersey Devils record for most points in one season (96).
 New Jersey Devils record for most points in a playoff season (23).
 New Jersey Devils record for career game-winning goals (79).
 New Jersey Devils record for career overtime goals (16).
 Most career overtime points (37).
 New Jersey Devils record for career hat tricks (8).
 New Jersey Devils record for career shots on goal (3,201).
 New Jersey Devils record for career power play goals (110).
 Eliáš is the only NHL player to be awarded two penalty shots in overtime. Both occurred in separate games versus the New York Islanders, and in both cases, Eliáš missed the penalty shot.

Career statistics

Regular season and playoffs

International

Awards
NHL
 Stanley Cup champion – 2000, 2003
 NHL All-Star Game – 2000, 2002, 2011, 2015
 NHL First All-Star team – 2001
 NHL Plus-Minus Award – 2001 (shared with Joe Sakic)
 NHL All-Rookie team – 1998

International
 Winter Olympics bronze medal – 2006
 Ice Hockey World Championship bronze medal – 1998, 2011
 Golden Hockey Stick – 2009, 2012

See also
List of NHL players with 1,000 games played
List of NHL players with 1,000 points
List of NHL players who spent their entire career with one franchise

References

External links

 

 

1976 births
Living people
Albany River Rats players
Czech expatriate ice hockey players in Russia
Czech expatriate ice hockey players in the United States
Czech ice hockey left wingers
Czechoslovak ice hockey left wingers
Ice hockey players at the 2002 Winter Olympics
Ice hockey players at the 2006 Winter Olympics
Ice hockey players at the 2010 Winter Olympics
Ice hockey players at the 2014 Winter Olympics
Medalists at the 2006 Winter Olympics
Metallurg Magnitogorsk players
National Hockey League All-Stars
National Hockey League players with retired numbers
New Jersey Devils draft picks
New Jersey Devils players
Olympic bronze medalists for the Czech Republic
Olympic ice hockey players of the Czech Republic
Olympic medalists in ice hockey
Orli Znojmo players
Rytíři Kladno players
Sportspeople from Třebíč
Stanley Cup champions